Mustapha Afandi (born 22 February 1958) is a Moroccan former cyclist. He competed in the individual road race event at the 1984 Summer Olympics.

References

External links
 

1958 births
Living people
Moroccan male cyclists
Olympic cyclists of Morocco
Cyclists at the 1984 Summer Olympics
Place of birth missing (living people)